Leney is a surname, and may refer to:

 William Satchwell Leney (1769—1831) English engraver
 Frederick Leney (1876—1921), English cricketer
 Herbert Leney (1850–1915), English cricketer
 Roger Leney (1923–2008), British military radio operator

See also
 Leney, Saskatchewan in Canada